Garbuttsville Cemetery is a historic cemetery located at the hamlet of Garbutt in the town of Wheatland in Monroe County, New York.  It is one of the earliest surviving cemeteries in Monroe County and is an intact country cemetery that reflects the history of the once thriving industrial hamlet of Garbuttsville (now Garbutt).  It also illustrates the development patterns of small vernacular cemeteries through the 19th century and prevalent styles of modest and middle class grave monuments from that period.  There are approximately 570 graves with most graves dating prior to 1920.

John Garbutt (ca. 1779–1855) is buried in the cemetery.

It was listed on the National Register of Historic Places in 2006.

References

External links
 
 Records of the Garbuttsville Cemetery, Wheatland, Monroe Co., NY

Cemeteries on the National Register of Historic Places in New York (state)
Cemeteries in Monroe County, New York
National Register of Historic Places in Monroe County, New York